The Lockheed F-117 Nighthawk is a retired American single-seat, twin-engine stealth attack aircraft developed by Lockheed's secretive Skunk Works division and operated by the United States Air Force (USAF). It was the first operational aircraft to be designed with stealth technology.

The F-117 was based on the Have Blue technology demonstrator. The Nighthawk's maiden flight took place in 1981 at Groom Lake, Nevada, and the aircraft achieved initial operating capability status in 1983. The aircraft was shrouded in secrecy until it was revealed to the public in 1988. Of the 64 F-117s built, 59 were production versions, with the other five being prototypes.

The F-117 was widely publicized for its role in the Gulf War of 1991. Although it was commonly referred to as the "Stealth Fighter", it was strictly an attack aircraft. F-117s took part in the conflict in Yugoslavia, where one was shot down by a surface-to-air missile (SAM) in 1999. The U.S. Air Force retired the F-117 in April 2008, primarily due to the fielding of the F-22 Raptor. Despite the type's official retirement, a portion of the fleet has been kept in airworthy condition, and Nighthawks have been observed flying since 2009.

Development

Background and Have Blue 

In 1964, Pyotr Ufimtsev, a Soviet mathematician, published a seminal paper titled Method of Edge Waves in the Physical Theory of Diffraction in the journal of the Moscow Institute for Radio Engineering, in which he showed that the strength of the radar return from an object is related to its edge configuration, not its size. Ufimtsev was extending theoretical work published by the German physicist Arnold Sommerfeld. Ufimtsev demonstrated that he could calculate the radar cross-section across a wing's surface and along its edge. The obvious and logical conclusion was that even a large aircraft could reduce its radar signature by exploiting this principle. However, the resulting design would make the aircraft aerodynamically unstable, and the state of computer technology in the early 1960s could not provide the kinds of flight computers which would later allow aircraft such as the F-117 and B-2 Spirit to stay airborne. By the 1970s, when Lockheed analyst Denys Overholser found Ufimtsev's paper, computers and software had advanced significantly, and the stage was set for the development of a stealth airplane.

The F-117 was born after the Vietnam War, where increasingly sophisticated Soviet surface-to-air missiles (SAMs) had downed heavy bombers. The heavy losses inflicted by Soviet-made SAMs upon the Israeli air force in the 1973 Yom Kippur war also contributed to a 1974 Defense Science Board assessment that in case of a conflict in Central Europe, air defenses would likely prevent NATO air strikes on targets in Eastern Europe.

It was a black project, an ultra-secret program for much of its life; very few people in the Pentagon knew the program even existed. The project began in 1975 with a model called the "Hopeless Diamond" (a wordplay on the Hope Diamond because of its appearance). The following year, the Defense Advanced Research Projects Agency (DARPA) issued Lockheed Skunk Works a contract to build and test two Stealth Strike Fighters, under the code name "Have Blue". These subscale aircraft incorporated jet engines of the Northrop T-38A, fly-by-wire systems of the F-16, landing gear of the A-10, and environmental systems of the C-130. By bringing together existing technology and components, Lockheed built two demonstrators under budget, at $35 million for both aircraft, and in record time. Undersecretary of Defense for Research and Engineering William J. Perry was instrumental in shepherding the project.

The maiden flight of the demonstrators occurred on 1 December 1977. Although both aircraft crashed during the demonstration program, test data proved positive. The success of Have Blue led the government to increase funding for stealth technology. Much of that increase was allocated towards the production of an operational stealth aircraft, the Lockheed F-117A, under the program code name "Senior Trend".

Senior Trend 
The decision to produce the F-117A was made on 1 November 1978, and a contract was awarded to Lockheed Advanced Development Projects, popularly known as the Skunk Works, in Burbank, California. The program was led by Ben Rich, with Alan Brown as manager of the project. Rich called on Bill Schroeder, a Lockheed mathematician, and Overholser, a computer scientist, to exploit Ufimtsev's work. The three designed a computer program called "Echo", which made it possible to design an airplane with flat panels, called facets, which were arranged so as to scatter over 99% of a radar's signal energy "painting" the aircraft.

The first YF-117A, serial number 79-10780, made its maiden flight from Groom Lake ("Area 51"), Nevada, on 18 June 1981, only 31 months after the full-scale development decision. The first production F-117A was delivered in 1982, and operational capability was achieved in October 1983. The 4450th Tactical Group stationed at Nellis Air Force Base, Nevada, were tasked with the operational development of the early F-117, and between 1981 (prior to the arrival of the first models) and 1989 they used LTV A-7 Corsair IIs for training, to bring all pilots to a common flight training baseline and later as chase planes for F-117A tests.

The F-117 was secret for much of the 1980s. Many news articles discussed what they called a "F-19" stealth fighter, and the Testor Corporation produced a very inaccurate scale model. When an F-117 crashed in Sequoia National Forest in July 1986, killing the pilot and starting a fire, the Air Force established restricted airspace. Armed guards prohibited entry, including firefighters, and a helicopter gunship circled the site. All F-117 debris was replaced with remains of a F-101A Voodoo crash stored at Area 51. When another fatal crash in October 1987 occurred inside Nellis, the military again provided little information to the press.

The Air Force denied the existence of the aircraft until 10 November 1988, when Assistant Secretary of Defense J. Daniel Howard displayed a grainy photograph at a Pentagon press conference, disproving the many inaccurate rumors about the shape of the "F-19". After the announcement pilots could fly the F-117 during daytime and no longer needed to be associated with the A-7, flying the T-38 supersonic trainer for travel and training instead. In April 1990, two F-117 aircraft were flown into Nellis, arriving during daylight and publicly displayed to a crowd of tens of thousands.

Five Full Scale Development (FSD) aircraft were built, designated "YF-117A". The last of 59 production F-117s were delivered on 3 July 1990. As the Air Force has stated, "Streamlined management by Aeronautical Systems Center, Wright-Patterson AFB, Ohio, combined breakthrough stealth technology with concurrent development and production to rapidly field the aircraft ... The F-117A program demonstrates that a stealth aircraft can be designed for reliability and maintainability."

Designation 
The operational aircraft was officially designated "F-117A". Most modern U.S. military aircraft use post-1962 designations in which the designation "F" is usually an air-to-air fighter, "B" is usually a bomber, "A" is usually a ground-attack aircraft, etc. (Examples include the F-15, the B-2 and the A-6.) The F-117 is primarily an attack aircraft, so its "F" designation is inconsistent with the DoD system. This is an inconsistency that has been repeatedly employed by the U.S. Air Force with several of its attack aircraft since the late 1950s, including the Republic F-105 Thunderchief and General Dynamics F-111 Aardvark. A televised documentary quoted project manager Alan Brown as saying that Robert J. Dixon, a four-star Air Force general who was the head of Tactical Air Command, felt that the top-notch USAF fighter pilots required to fly the new aircraft were more easily attracted to an aircraft with an "F" designation for fighter, as opposed to a bomber ("B") or attack ("A") designation.

The designation "F-117" seems to indicate that it was given an official designation prior to the 1962 U.S. Tri-Service Aircraft Designation System and could be considered numerically to be a part of the earlier "Century series" of fighters. The assumption prior to the revealing of the aircraft to the public was that it would likely receive the F-19 designation as that number had not been used. However, there were no other aircraft to receive a "100" series number following the F-111. Soviet fighters obtained by the U.S. via various means under the Constant Peg program were given F-series numbers for their evaluation by U.S. pilots, and with the advent of the Teen Series fighters, most often Century Series designations.

As with other exotic military aircraft types flying in the southern Nevada area, such as captured fighters, an arbitrary radio call of "117" was assigned. This same radio call had been used by the enigmatic 4477th Test and Evaluation Squadron, also known as the "Red Hats" or "Red Eagles", that often had flown expatriated MiG jet fighters in the area, but there was no relationship to the call and the formal F-19 designation then being considered by the Air Force. Apparently, use of the "117" radio call became commonplace and when Lockheed released its first flight manual (i.e., the Air Force "dash one" manual for the aircraft), F-117A was the designation printed on the cover.

Design 

When the Air Force first approached Lockheed with the stealth concept, Skunk Works Director Kelly Johnson proposed a rounded design. He believed smoothly blended shapes offered the best combination of speed and stealth. However, his assistant, Ben Rich, showed that faceted-angle surfaces would provide a significant reduction in radar signature, and the necessary aerodynamic control could be provided with computer units. A May 1975 Skunk Works report, "Progress Report No. 2, High Stealth Conceptual Studies", showed the rounded concept that was rejected in favor of the flat-sided approach.
The resulting unusual design surprised and puzzled experienced pilots. A Royal Air Force (RAF) pilot who flew it as an exchange officer stated that when he first saw a photograph of the still-secret F-117, he "promptly giggled and thought [to himself] 'this clearly can't fly. Early stealth aircraft were designed with a focus on minimal radar cross-section (RCS) rather than aerodynamic performance. Highly stealthy aircraft like the F-117 Nighthawk are aerodynamically unstable in all three aircraft principal axes and require constant flight corrections from a fly-by-wire (FBW) flight system to maintain controlled flight. It is shaped to deflect radar signals and is approximately the size of an F-15 Eagle.

The single-seat Nighthawk is powered by two non-afterburning General Electric F404 turbofan engines. It is air refuelable and features a V-tail. The cockpit was quite spacious, with ergonomic displays and controls, but the field of view was somewhat obstructed with a large blind spot to the rear.

Avionics 
The F-117 has quadruple-redundant fly-by-wire flight controls. To lower development costs, the avionics, fly-by-wire systems, and other systems and parts were derived from the General Dynamics F-16 Fighting Falcon, Boeing B-52 Stratofortress, McDonnell Douglas F/A-18 Hornet, and McDonnell Douglas F-15E Strike Eagle. The parts were originally described as spares in budgets for these aircraft, to keep the F-117 project secret.

The aircraft is equipped with sophisticated navigation and attack systems integrated into a digital avionics suite. It navigates primarily by GPS and high-accuracy inertial navigation. Missions are coordinated by an automated planning system that can automatically perform all aspects of an attack mission, including weapons release. Targets are acquired by a thermal imaging infrared system, paired with a laser rangefinder/laser designator that finds the range and designates targets for laser-guided bombs. The F-117A's split internal bay can carry  of ordnance. Typical weapons are a pair of GBU-10, GBU-12, or GBU-27 laser-guided bombs, two BLU-109 penetration bombs, or two Joint Direct Attack Munitions (JDAM) GPS/INS guided stand-off bombs. To maintain its low observability, the aircraft was not fitted with its own radar; not only would an active radar be detectable through its emissions, but an inactive radar would also act as a reflector of radar energy.

Stealth 

Among the penalties for stealth are lower engine thrust due to losses in the inlet and outlet, a very low wing aspect ratio, and a high sweep angle (50°) needed to deflect incoming radar waves to the sides. With these design considerations and no afterburner, the F-117 is limited to subsonic speeds.

The F-117A carries no radar, which lowers emissions and cross-section, and whether it carries any radar detection equipment remained classified as of 2008. Its faceted shape (made from 2-dimensional flat surfaces) resulted from the limitations of the 1970s-era computer technology used to calculate its radar cross-section. Later supercomputers made it possible for subsequent aircraft like the B-2 bomber to use curved surfaces while maintaining stealth, through the use of far more computational resources to perform the additional calculations.

The radar-absorbent flat sheets covering the F-117A weighed almost one ton, and were held in place by glue, with the gaps between the sheets filled with a kind of putty material called "butter".

An exhaust plume contributes a significant infrared signature. The F-117 reduces IR signature with a non-circular tail pipe (a slit shape) to minimize the exhaust cross-section and maximize the mixing of hot exhaust with cool ambient air. The F-117 lacks afterburners, because the hot exhaust would increase the infrared signature, and breaking the sound barrier would produce an obvious sonic boom, as well as surface heating of the aircraft skin which also increases the infrared footprint. As a result, its performance in air combat maneuvering required in a dogfight would never match that of a dedicated fighter aircraft. This was unimportant in the case of this aircraft since it was designed to be an attack aircraft.

Passive (multistatic) radar, bistatic radar and especially multistatic radar systems detect some stealth aircraft better than conventional monostatic radars, since first-generation stealth technology (such as the F-117) reflects energy away from the transmitter's line of sight, effectively increasing the radar cross section (RCS) in other directions, which the passive radars monitor.

Operational history 

During the program's early years, from 1984 to mid-1992, the F-117A fleet was based at Tonopah Test Range Airport, Nevada, where it served under the 4450th Tactical Group. Because the F-117 was classified during this time, the unit was officially located at Nellis Air Force Base, Nevada, and equipped with A-7 Corsair II aircraft. All military personnel were permanently assigned to Nellis AFB, and most personnel and their families lived in Las Vegas. This required commercial air and trucking to transport personnel between Las Vegas and Tonopah each week. The 4450th was absorbed by the 37th Tactical Fighter Wing in 1989. In 1992, the entire fleet was transferred to Holloman Air Force Base, New Mexico, under the command of the 49th Fighter Wing. This move also eliminated the Key Air and American Trans Air contract flights to Tonopah, which flew 22,000 passenger trips on 300 flights from Nellis to Tonopah per month.

The F-117 reached initial operating capability status in 1983. The Nighthawk's pilots called themselves "Bandits". Each of the 558 Air Force pilots who have flown the F-117 has a Bandit number, such as "Bandit 52", that indicates the sequential order of their first flight in the F-117. Pilots told friends and families that they flew the Northrop F-5 in aggressor squadrons against Tactical Air Command.

The F-117 has been used several times in war. Its first mission was during the United States invasion of Panama in 1989. During that invasion two F-117A Nighthawks dropped two bombs on Rio Hato airfield.

During the Gulf War in 1991, the F-117 flew approximately 1,300 sorties and scored direct hits on what the U.S. called 1,600 high-value targets in Iraq over 6,905 flight hours. Leaflet drops on Iraqi forces displayed the F-117 destroying ground targets and warned "Escape now and save yourselves". Only 229 Coalition tactical aircraft could drop and designate laser-guided bombs of which 36 F-117s represented 15.7%, and only the USAF had the I-2000 bombs intended for hardened targets. So the F-117 represented 32% of all coalition aircraft that could deliver such bombs. Notably, F-117s were used in the Amiriyah shelter bombing killing at least 408 civilians.

Early claims of the F-117's effectiveness were later found to be overstated. Initial reports of F-117s hitting 80% of their targets were later scaled back to "41–60%". On the first night, they failed to hit 40% of their assigned air-defense targets, including the Air Defense Operations Center in Baghdad, and 8 such targets remained functional out of 10 that could be assessed. In their Desert Storm white paper, the USAF stated that "the F-117 was the only airplane that the planners dared risk over downtown Baghdad" and that this area was particularly well defended. (Dozens of F-16s were routinely tasked to attack Baghdad in the first few days of the war.) In fact, most of the air defenses were on the outskirts of the city and many other aircraft hit targets in the downtown area, with minimal casualties when they attacked at night like the F-117; they avoided the optically aimed anti-aircraft cannon and infrared SAMs which were the biggest threat to Coalition aircraft. 

The aircraft was operated in secret from Tonopah for almost a decade, but after the Gulf War the aircraft moved to Holloman in 1992—however, its integration with the USAF's non-stealth "iron jets" occurred slowly. As one senior F-117A pilot later said: Because of ongoing secrecy others continued to see the aircraft as "none of their business, a stand-alone system". The F-117A and the men and women of the 49th Fighter Wing were deployed to Southwest Asia on multiple occasions. On their first deployment, with the aid of aerial refueling, pilots flew non-stop from Holloman to Kuwait, a flight of approximately 18.5 hours.

Combat over Yugoslavia 

One F-117 (AF ser. no. 82-0806) was lost to enemy action. It was downed during an Operation Allied Force mission against the Army of Yugoslavia on 27 March 1999. SA-3s were then launched by a Yugoslav version of the Soviet Isayev S-125 "Neva" (NATO name SA-3 "Goa") anti-aircraft missile system. The launcher was run by the 3rd Battalion of the 250th Air Defence Missile Brigade under the command of Colonel Zoltán Dani.

After the explosion, the aircraft became uncontrollable, forcing the pilot to eject. The pilot was recovered six hours later by a United States Air Force Pararescue team. The stealth technology from the downed F-117 may have been acquired by Russia and China, but the U.S. did not attempt to destroy the wreckage because senior Pentagon officials argued that its technology was already dated and no longer important to protect.

American sources state that a second F-117 was targeted and damaged during the campaign, allegedly on 30 April 1999. The aircraft returned to Spangdahlem base, but it supposedly never flew again. The USAF continued using the F-117 during Operation Allied Force.

Later service and retirement 

The F-117 was later used in the Operation Enduring Freedom in 2001 and Operation Iraqi Freedom in 2003. It was only operated by the U.S. Air Force.

The loss in Serbia caused the USAF to create a subsection of their existing weapons school to improve tactics. More training was done with other units, and the F-117A began to participate in Red Flag exercises. Though advanced for its time, the F-117's stealthy faceted airframe required a large amount of maintenance and was eventually superseded by streamlined shapes produced with computer-aided design. Other weapon systems began to take on the F-117's roles, such as the F-22 Raptor gaining the ability to drop guided bombs. By 2005, the aircraft was used only for certain missions, such as if a pilot needed to verify that the correct target had been hit, or when minimal collateral damage was vital.

The USAF had once planned to retire the F-117 in 2011, but Program Budget Decision 720 (PBD 720), dated 28 December 2005, proposed retiring it by October 2008 to free up an estimated $1.07 billion to buy more F-22s. PBD 720 called for 10 F-117s to be retired in FY2007 and the remaining 42 in FY2008, stating that other USAF planes and missiles could stealthily deliver precision ordnance, including the B-2 Spirit, F-22 and JASSM. The planned introduction of the multi-role F-35 Lightning II also contributed to the retirement decision.

In late 2006, the USAF closed the F-117 formal training unit (FTU), and announced the retirement of the F-117. The first six aircraft to be retired took their last flight on 12 March 2007 after a ceremony at Holloman AFB to commemorate the aircraft's career. Brigadier General David L. Goldfein, commander of the 49th Fighter Wing, said at the ceremony, "With the launch of these great aircraft today, the circle comes to a close—their service to our nation's defense fulfilled, their mission accomplished and a job well done. We send them today to their final resting place—a home they are intimately familiar with—their first, and only, home outside of Holloman."

Unlike most other USAF aircraft that are retired to Davis-Monthan AFB for scrapping, or dispersal to museums, most of the F-117s were placed in "Type 1000" storage in their original hangars at the Tonopah Test Range Airport. At Tonopah, their wings were removed and the aircraft are stored in their original climate-controlled hangars. The decommissioning occurred in eight phases, with the operational aircraft retired to Tonopah in seven waves from 13 March 2007 until the last wave's arrival on 22 April 2008. Four aircraft were kept flying beyond April by the 410th Flight Test Squadron at Palmdale for flight test. By August, two were remaining. The last F-117 (AF Serial No. 86-0831) left Palmdale to fly to Tonopah on 11 August 2008. With the last aircraft retired, the 410th was inactivated in a ceremony on 1 August 2008.

Five aircraft were placed in museums, including the first four YF-117As and some remains of the F-117 shot down over Serbia. Through 2009, one F-117 had been scrapped; AF Serial No. 79-0784 was scrapped at the Palmdale test facility on 26 April 2008. It was the last F-117 at Palmdale and was scrapped to test an effective method for destroying F-117 airframes.

Congress had ordered that all F-117s  from 30 September 2006 onwards were to be maintained "in a condition that would allow recall of that aircraft to future service" as part of the 2007 National Defense Authorization Act. By April 2016, lawmakers appeared ready to "remove the requirement that certain F-117 aircraft be maintained in a condition that would allow recall of those aircraft to future service", which would move them from storage to the aerospace maintenance and regeneration yard in Arizona to be scavenged for hard-to-find parts, or completely disassembled. On 11 September 2017, it was reported that in accordance with the National Defense Authorization Act for Fiscal Year 2017, signed into law on 23 December 2016, "the Air Force will remove four F-117s every year to fully divest them—a process known as demilitarizing aircraft".

Post-retirement sightings 
Although officially retired, the F-117 fleet remained intact as of 2009, with photos showing the aircraft carefully mothballed. As of 2016, the retired fleet comprised over 50 airframes, with some of the aircraft being flown periodically. F-117s were spotted flying periodically from 2014 to 2019. In March 2019, it was reported that four F-117s had been secretly deployed to the Middle East in 2016 and that one had to make an emergency landing at Ali Al Salem (OKAS), Kuwait sometime late that year.

In February 2019, an F-117 was observed flying through the R-2508 Special Use Airspace Complex in the vicinity of Edwards Air Force Base, escorted by two F-16 Fighting Falcons that may have been providing top cover. Closer photographs of the aircraft revealed that the tail code had been scrubbed in an attempt to remove the paint. The partially-intact code identified it as a former aircraft of the 49th Operations Group. An F-117 was also photographed in 2019 carrying unit markings previously unassociated with the aircraft—a band on the tail bearing the name Dark Knights, suggesting either an official or unofficial squadron is maintaining the Nighthawks. In July 2019, one Nighthawk in a hybrid aggressor paint scheme was spotted flying above Death Valley, trailing behind a KC-135R Stratotanker.

In March 2020, a spectator recorded an F-117 flying through the "Star Wars Canyon" in Death Valley, California. On 20 May 2020, two more F-117s were sighted in a common aerial refueling area of Southern California trailing a NKC-135R Stratotanker from Edwards AFB, California. In October 2020, at least two F-117s arrived at MCAS Miramar, featuring a tail code of TR which the Nighthawks based at Tonopah Range had previously used.

On 13 September 2021, a pair of F-117s landed at Fresno Yosemite International Airport in California. They were scheduled to train with the California Air National Guard F-15C/D Eagles of the 144th Fighter Wing over the next few days. One aircraft had red letters on its tail, and the other had white letters. One of the two was observed to not be fitted with radar reflectors. That year USAF published photographs on DVIDS, the first acknowledgement by the service that the aircraft continued to fly after its official retirement.

In January 2022, two F-117s were observed in flight in the Saline Military Operating Area. One had portions of its exterior covered in a "mirror-like coating" believed to be an experimental treatment to reduce the aircraft's infrared signature. In September the Air Force Test Center published a Request for Information for a F-117 support contract at Tonopah, indicating that USAF wants to keep flying it until 2034. The service is using the aircraft in aggressor squadron and cruise missile training, and research and development. USAF has also slowed the retirement of its current inventory of about 45 F-117s to two to three units a year.

Variants

F-117N "Seahawk" 

The United States Navy tested the F-117 in 1984 but determined it was unsuitable for carrier use. In the early 1990s, Lockheed proposed an upgraded carrier-capable F-117 variant dubbed the "Seahawk" to the Navy as an alternative to the canceled A/F-X program. The unsolicited proposal was received poorly by the Department of Defense, which lacked interest in the single mission capabilities on offer, particularly as it would take money away from the Joint Advanced Strike Technology program, which evolved into the Joint Strike Fighter. The F-117N would have differed from the land-based F-117 in several ways, such as the use of "elevators, a bubble canopy, a less sharply swept wing and reconfigured tail". It would also be re-engined with General Electric F414 turbofans in place of the General Electric F404s. The aircraft would be optionally fitted with hardpoints, allowing for an additional  of payload, and a new ground-attack radar with air-to-air capability. In that role, the F-117N could carry AIM-120 AMRAAM air-to-air missiles.

F-117B 

After being rebuffed by the Navy, Lockheed submitted an updated proposal that included afterburning capability and a larger emphasis on the F-117N as a multi-mission aircraft, rather than just an attack aircraft. To boost interest, Lockheed also proposed an F-117B land-based variant that shared most of the F-117N capabilities. This variant was proposed to the USAF and RAF. Two RAF pilots formally evaluated the aircraft in 1986 as a reward for British help with the American bombing of Libya that year, RAF exchange officers began flying the F-117 in 1987, and the British declined an offer during the Reagan administration to purchase the aircraft. This renewed F-117N proposal was also known as the A/F-117X. Neither the F-117N nor the F-117B were ordered.

Operators 

United States
 United States Air Force
 4450th Tactical Group – Tonopah Test Range, Nevada
 4450th Tactical Squadron (1981–1989)
 4451st Tactical Squadron (1981–1989)
 4453rd Test and Evaluation Squadron (1985–1989)
 37th Tactical Fighter Wing/Fighter Wing – Tonopah Test Range
 415th Tactical Fighter Squadron (1989–1992)
 416th Tactical Fighter Squadron (1989–1992)
 417th Tactical Fighter Training Squadron (1989–1992)
 49th Fighter Wing – Holloman AFB, New Mexico
 7th Fighter Squadron (1992–2006)
 8th Fighter Squadron (1992–2008)
 9th Fighter Squadron (1993–2008)
 412th Test Wing – Edwards AFB, California
 410th Flight Test Squadron (1993–2008)

Aircraft on display

United States 

YF-117A
 79-10780 Scorpion 1 – on pedestal display on Nellis Boulevard, at the entrance to Nellis Air Force Base, Nevada. It was put in place on 16 May 1992, the first F-117 to be made a gate guardian.
 79-10781 Scorpion 2 – National Museum of the United States Air Force at Wright-Patterson Air Force Base outside Dayton, Ohio. It was delivered to the museum on 17 July 1991.
 79-10782 Scorpion 3 – Holloman Air Force Base, New Mexico. It was repainted to resemble the first F-117A used to drop weapons in combat. This aircraft was used for acoustics and navigation system testing. While wearing a flag painted on its bottom surface, this aircraft revealed the type's existence to high-ranking officials at Groom Lake on 14 December 1983, the first semi-public unveiling of the aircraft. It was placed on display at Holloman AFB on 5 April 2008.
 79-10783 Scorpion 4 – It had been previously on display at the Blackbird Airpark Museum at Air Force Plant 42, Palmdale, California. In June 2012, Scorpion 4 was transported from Blackbird Airpark to Edwards AFB for restoration work; it is planned for the aircraft to be displayed at the Air Force Flight Test Center Museum.

F-117A

 80-0785 – Pole-mounted outside the Skunk Works facility at United States Air Force Plant 42 in Palmdale, California. Hybrid airframe comprising the wreckage of 80–0785, the first production F-117A, and static test articles 778 and 779. It is fixed to a pedestal and serves as a monument.
 82-0799 Midnight Rider – Hill Aerospace Museum; Aircraft arrived at the museum on 5 August 2020; it is to be prepared and painted for display. It is displayed with the paint feathered.
 82-0803 Unexpected Guest – Displayed outside the Ronald Reagan Presidential Library in Simi Valley, California.It was fixed to a pedestal and became a monument.
 84-0810 Dark Angel – On 13 November 2022 it was reported on social media that the airframe was being delivered from Tonopah Test Range to the Pima Air & Space Museum.
 85-0813 The Toxic Avenger – Delivered to Castle Air Museum in Atwater, California on 29 July 2022 for restoration and then display. Restoration is expected to take about a year and cost around $75,000.
 85-0817 Shaba – Arrived at the Kalamazoo Air Zoo on 11 December 2020 to be partially restored and put on display.
 85-0819 Raven Beauty – Scheduled to be transported to the Stafford Air & Space Museum in early 2020 for preservation.
 84-0827 – Stripped fuselage listed as "scrap" on a government surplus website in early 2020. Fate unknown.
 85-0831 – Located at the Strategic Air Command & Aerospace Museum in Ashland, Nebraska, where it is scheduled for restoration and display. It served as a test aircraft at Air Force Plant 42 in Palmdale, California from 1987 to 2008.
 85-0833 Black Devil – Unveiled at Palm Springs Air Museum on 3 October 2020. Under restoration and scheduled for public display in Spring 2021.

Serbia 
F-117A
 82-0806 Something Wicked – shot down over Serbia; the remains are displayed at the Museum of Aviation in Belgrade close to Belgrade Nikola Tesla Airport.

Nicknames 

The aircraft's official name is "Night Hawk", however the alternative form "Nighthawk" is frequently used.

As it prioritized stealth over aerodynamics, it earned the nickname "Wobblin' Goblin" due to its alleged instability at low speeds. However, F-117 pilots have stated the nickname is undeserved. "Wobblin' (or Wobbly) Goblin" is likely a holdover from the early Have Blue / Senior Trend (FSD) days of the project when instability was a problem. In the USAF, "Goblin" (without wobbly) persists as a nickname because of the aircraft's appearance. During Operation Desert Storm, Saudis dubbed the aircraft "Shaba", which is Arabic for "Ghost". Some pilots also called the airplane the "Stinkbug".

During the NATO bombing of Yugoslavia in 1999 it picked up the nickname "Invisible" (Serbian cyrillic "Невидљиви", latin "Nevidljivi") and it gained popularity after it was shot down over Serbian airspace near Buđanovci. The F-117 downing became a spot of Serbian pride with a phrase "We didn't know it was invisible" was coined.

Specifications (F-117A)

Notable appearances in media 

The Omaha Nighthawks professional American football team used the F-117 Nighthawk as its logo.

See also

References

Notes

Bibliography

Further reading

External links 

 Lockheed F-117A Nighthawk. National Museum of the United States Air Force
 The 49th Fighter Wing at Holloman Air Force Base
 F-117A.com – The "Black Jet" website (a comprehensive site)
 F-117 article and Stealth article on Centennial of Flight web site
 F-117A Nighthawk page on AirAttack.com
 F-117A Nighthawk page on FAS.org 
 "Filling the Stealth Gap", in Air and Space Power Journal Fall 2006 
 The Advent, Evolution, and New Horizons of United States Stealth Aircraft
 "The Secrets of Stealth" on Discovery Military Channel
 Austrian Radar Plots on acig.org
 CNN – NATO air attack shifts, aims at violence inside Kosovo – 27 March 1999
 Google Maps directory of all surviving F-117s on public display
  Austrian article about interception of F-117
 Russians admit testing F-117 lost in Yugoslavia, 2001 Flight Global article
 A revealing interview with F-117 test pilot Hal Farley documentary

F-117
Aircraft first flown in 1981
Articles containing video clips
Low-wing aircraft
Relaxed-stability aircraft
Stealth aircraft
Twinjets
1980s United States attack aircraft
V-tail aircraft